Gogita Gogua (born 4 October 1983) is a Georgian footballer who plays for Samegrelo Chkorotsku. While he mainly plays midfield, he can also play as a defender. Gogua has previously played for FC Tbilisi, Dinamo Tbilisi, FC Khimki and FC Saturn Ramenskoye. He signed in 2008 to try his second time in Spartak Nalchik, after playing 15 matches for Saturn Moscow Oblast. hf

Career

Club
On 21 February 2016, Gogua signed for Kazakhstan Premier League side Irtysh Pavlodar, leaving Irtysh Pavlodar less than Five-months later on 7 June 2016. Three days later, on 10 June 2016, Gogua signed for fellow Kazakhstan Premier League side FC Ordabasy.

On 15 June 2017, Gogua left Ordabasy, signing for FC Okzhetpes the following day.

References

External links

1983 births
People from Samegrelo-Zemo Svaneti
Living people
Footballers from Georgia (country)
Georgia (country) under-21 international footballers
Georgia (country) international footballers
Association football midfielders

FC Guria Lanchkhuti players
FC Merani Tbilisi players
FC Tbilisi players
FC Dinamo Tbilisi players
FC Khimki players
PFC Spartak Nalchik players
FC Saturn Ramenskoye players
FC Akhmat Grozny players
FC Volga Nizhny Novgorod players
FC Dila Gori players
FC SKA-Khabarovsk players
FC Irtysh Pavlodar players
FC Ordabasy players
FC Okzhetpes players
FC Kyzylzhar players
FC Samtredia players
FC Shevardeni-1906 Tbilisi players
FC Sioni Bolnisi players
FC Kolkheti-1913 Poti players
Russian First League players
Russian Premier League players
Kazakhstan Premier League players
Erovnuli Liga players
Erovnuli Liga 2 players
Expatriate footballers from Georgia (country)
Expatriate footballers in Russia
Expatriate sportspeople from Georgia (country) in Russia
Expatriate footballers in Kazakhstan
Expatriate sportspeople from Georgia (country) in Kazakhstan